Muskegon Lake is a  fresh-water lake in Muskegon County, Michigan, USA.

Hydrology
On the north, Bear Creek/Lake empties into the lake via the Bear Lake Channel and on the south, Ryerson Creek and Ruddiman Creek flow into Muskegon Lake.

History
Muskegon Lake played an important role in the early development of the city of Muskegon, as well as the logging industry in Michigan.  Timber, particularly white pine, was harvested throughout central Michigan and floated downstream on the Muskegon River to the lake, which at one time boasted more than 47 sawmills along its banks.

Cities and parks

Cities located on Muskegon Lake include Muskegon, Michigan and North Muskegon, Michigan.  Major parks located along Muskegon Lake include Muskegon State Park on the north at Lake Michigan, Heritage Landing in downtown Muskegon, and Pere Marquette Park on the south at Lake Michigan.

Transportation
Docks for the Lake Express Cross-Lake Ferry which provides ferry service across Lake Michigan between Muskegon, Michigan to Milwaukee, Wisconsin, are located on the southern shore of Muskegon Lake.  Muskegon Lake sightseeing trips are also available aboard the Aquastar (formerly the Port City Princess).

Recreational activities
Several public and private marinas and boat launch facilities are located along the shores of Muskegon Lake and recreational sailing and boating are popular activities.  Sport fishing is also popular on Muskegon Lake where King Salmon, Coho Salmon, Steelhead, Brown Trout, Lake Trout and Perch are found.  Other popular activities include camping, hiking, picnicking, ice boating, concerts and festivals.

See also
List of lakes in Michigan

References

External links

 Yahoo! Education — Muskegon, river, United States
 Department of Natural Resources  — Muskegon River Watershed Assessment
  
NOAA nautical chart
 
NOAA Nautical chart of Muskegon Lake

Lakes of Michigan
Lakes of Muskegon County, Michigan